Eleanor O'Meara was a former Canadian figure skater who competed in single skating and pair skating with Ralph McCreath, with whom was the 1941 national and North American champion. In singles, she was the 1936 and 1938 National champion.

Results

Singles career

Pairs career
(with Ralph McCreath)

References
 North American Championships info

Canadian female pair skaters
Canadian female single skaters
Figure skaters from Toronto
2000 deaths
Year of birth missing
21st-century Canadian women